Wrights Creek is a locality in the Cairns Region, Queensland, Australia.

The origin of the suburb name is from the Wright brothers who brought cattle to Wrights Creek in the year 1878.

Geography 
The locality is mostly low-lying flat land (approx 10 metres above sea level) with a small area of mountainous area in the south-west of the locality rising to an unnamed peak of 200 metres above sea level. The Trinity Inlet (aka Smith Creek) is the northern boundary of the locality while Wrights Creek (the watercourse from which the locality takes its name) and Mackey Creek form parts of the eastern and western boundaries of the locality. Warner Road is the southern boundary. The northern part of the locality is undeveloped wetlands and the mountainous region is also undeveloped. However, most of the locality is used for farming (predominantly sugarcane).

The Bruce Highway and North Coast railway line pass through the south-western part of the locality; Kamma railway station services the local area. There is also a network of cane tramways to transport the harvested sugarcane to the Mulgrave Sugar Mill.

History 
Wrights Creek is situated in the Yidinji traditional Aboriginal country.
Wright's Creek Provisional School opened on 8 October 1894, becoming Wright's Creek State School on 1 January 1909. It closed in 1953.

Development 
As part of the Wrights Creek development plan, a trade, enterprise, freight and industry zone has been proposed in the southern part of Wrights Creek nearby Gordonvale to diversify the economy of the Cairns region and to provide employment opportunities. The development plan utilises the location of the Bruce Highway and North Coast railway line transport corridors. Significant portions of land would be retained for the purpose of sugarcane farming in the area and environmental management purposes. The local council supported the state development area on the basis that existing private businesses in the region would not be impacted by competition.

As part of the Bruce Highway Southern Access Corridor development project, the construction of an off-road cycling path and an upgrade of the Bruce Highway has been funded by the state and federal governments, with construction expected to be completed from 2021–2023.

References

External links 

Cairns Region
Localities in Queensland